The electoral district of Horsham was an electoral district of the Legislative Assembly in the Australian state of Victoria, centered on the town of Horsham, Victoria. It was created in 1889 and abolished in 1904.

Members for Horsham

References

Former electoral districts of Victoria (Australia)
1889 establishments in Australia
1904 disestablishments in Australia